Muhammad Yusuf Abdullah Haroon (1916 – 12 February 2011) was a Pakistani businessman and politician who served as the 5th Governor of West Pakistan and 3rd Chief Minister of Sindh.

Early life and family
Born in 1916 to Abdullah Haroon, Yusuf worked closely with Quaid-e-Azam Muhammad Ali Jinnah as his personal assistant and was active in the Pakistan Movement. He was a witness to All-India Muslim League's 25th session in Allahabad in 1930.

Yusuf was married Pasha Haroon, a niece of Aga Khan III who was the 48th Imam of the Ismaili Shias, in 1937.

Career
Yusuf was active in politics spanning nearly seven decades. 

From May 10, 1944, to May 8, 1945, he served as mayor of Pre-independence Karachi. After the independence, he became chief minister of Sindh and served as the chief minister between 1949–50 and then as a governor of West Pakistan in 1969.

Yusuf also served as a federal minister and as a high commissioner to Australia. In addition, he worked briefly as chief editor, Daily Dawn newspaper in 1966. After moving to New York, he served as an executive of the now-defunct Pan Am Airlines before retiring.

As chief minister of Sindh, Yusuf Haroon piloted a bill for land reform to abolish large land-holdings. When the bill failed to pass, he resigned from his position as chief minister.

Dawn

Yusuf Haroon was a founding member of the Dawn. In 1946, when Yusuf was in New Delhi to attend a constituent assembly session, Jinnah called him to his residence and asked him to discontinue the newspaper The Herald, then edited by Desmond Young, and instead start the publication of Dawn in Karachi, Pakistan, the soon-to-be independent nation, even though Dawn’s Delhi edition would continue to be published. Jinnah also asked him and his family to buy all the shares of the new newspaper company.

He became the chief editor of the Dawn newspaper in April 1966 after the long time editor Altaf Husain decided to join the cabinet of President of Pakistan, Field Marshal Ayub Khan in March 1965. Altaf Husain had been hand-picked by Jinnah to be the editor of Dawn, Delhi before 1947. He was also elected the president of the All Pakistan Newspapers Society of Pakistan for the term 1966–67. Yusuf Haroon's independent-looking outlook annoyed the next President of Pakistan General Yahya Khan and he had to leave Pakistan in a hurry to avoid arrest in 1969. He later decided to settle in New York and remained there after the Yahya Khan government fell in December 1971.

Death
Yusuf Haroon died on February 12, 2011, after a protracted illness, at the age of 95 in New York.

His funeral was attended by the former Pakistani prime minister Mir Zafarullah Khan Jamali, former Sindh governors Kamal Azfar and Moinuddin Haider, former speaker of National Assembly of Pakistan Illahi Bukhsh Soomro and the veteran politician Sherbaz Khan Mazari.

References

External  Links

1916 births
2011 deaths
Pakistani people of Iranian descent
Mayors of Karachi
Chief Ministers of Sindh
Governors of West Pakistan
Memon people
Yusuf
Dawn Media Group people
Politicians from Karachi
Pakistan Movement activists
St. Patrick's High School, Karachi alumni
Dawn (newspaper) editors